Justin Wakeland High School is a public high school located in Frisco, Texas, United States. It is classified as a 5A school by the University Interscholastic League (UIL). It is a part of the Frisco Independent School District, and is one of twelve district high schools. It opened on August 14, 2006. Incoming freshmen usually come from Griffin Middle School and Cobb Middle School. In 2015, the school was rated "Met Standard" by the Texas Education Agency.

Namesake
The school was originally to be named Legacy High School. During construction, it was instead named for Justin Wakeland, who served as the superintendent of the Frisco ISD for 19 years from 1978 to 1997.

Athletics and fine arts
2010, 2017, 2018, 2021, 2022 (5A) Boys' soccer state champion
2011, 2018, 2022 (5A) Girls’ soccer state champion
2015 (5A) Boys' cross country state champion 
2018 (5A) Girls' cross country state champion 
2019 (5A) Marching Band State bronze medalist
2017, 2021 (5A) Marching Band Area B champion
2016, 2021 (5A) Area B Football Champion

Media attention
Marc Alan Carden, a former Wakeland coach and history teacher, was arrested and sentenced to 10 years in prison for sexually assaulting a 14 year old in 2014. The victim was a student in Frisco ISD.

References

External links
 

High schools in Denton County, Texas
2006 establishments in Texas
Educational institutions established in 2006
Frisco Independent School District high schools
Frisco, Texas